The 2014 Finlandia Trophy was a senior international figure skating competition in the 2014–15 season. A part of the 2014–15 ISU Challenger Series, the 19th edition of the annual event was held on October 9–12, 2014 at the Barona Arena in Espoo. Medals were awarded in the disciplines of men's singles, ladies' singles, ice dancing, and synchronized skating.

Entries
The entries are:

Schedule

Results

Men

Ladies

Ice dancing

Synchronized skating

References

External links
 2014 Finlandia Trophy at the International Skating Union
 2014 Finlandia Trophy results

2014
Finlandia Trophy